The 1975 Arkansas International was a men's tennis tournament played on hardcourts at Burns Park in North Little Rock, Arkansas in the United States that was part of the 1975 USLTA-IPA Indoor Circuit. It was the second edition of the event and was held from February 3 through February 9, 1975. Fourth-seeded Billy Martin won the singles title and earned $5,000 first-prize money.

Finals

Singles
 Billy Martin defeated  George Hardie 6–2, 7–6(5–4)
 It was Martin's only singles title of his career.

Doubles
 Marcello Lara /  Barry Phillips-Moore defeated  Jeff Austin /  Charles Owens 6–4, 6–3

References

External links
 ITF tournament edition details

Arkansas International
Arkansas International
Arkansas International